Gordon Bartlett (born 3 December 1955) is an English former professional footballer who played as a forward.

Playing career 
Bartlett was born in London. After beginning his career with West Ham United and Portsmouth, he played for the Denver Dynamos in the North American Soccer League. Following his time in the US, he returned to England and signed for non-league side Slough Town where he stayed for two years, making 43 appearances and  scoring seven times. He appeared in pre-season friendlies for Brentford, but failed to make a competitive appearance. His playing career was cut short by injury.

Managerial career 
After managerial spells at Yeading, Hounslow and Southall, Bartlett joined Wealdstone as manager in June 1995. 

Between May 2013 and August 2017, he was the longest-serving manager in the top six tiers of the English football pyramid system. On 21 August 2017, after 22 years in the role, it was announced that he had stepped down as the club's manager but would remain with the club in a backroom role.

Honours

As a manager 
Wealdstone
 Isthmian League Premier Division: 2013–14
 Isthmian League Second Division second-place promotion: 1997–98
 Isthmian League Third Division: 1996–97
 Middlesex Senior Charity Cup: 2003–04, 2010–11

Yeading
 Isthmian League First Division second-place promotion: 1991–92

Hounslow
 Hellenic League Premier Division second-place promotion: 1986–87

As an individual 
 Isthmian League Manager of the Year: 2013–14

References

Further reading 

1955 births
Living people
Portsmouth F.C. players
Brentford F.C. players
Slough Town F.C. players
North American Soccer League (1968–1984) players
Denver Dynamos players
Isthmian League managers
National League (English football) managers
Wealdstone F.C. managers
Isthmian League players
English Football League players
Footballers from Chiswick
English footballers
Association football forwards
English expatriate sportspeople in the United States
Expatriate soccer players in the United States
English expatriate footballers
English football managers